{{Speciesbox
|image =
|image_caption =
| status = CR
| status_system = IUCN3.1
| status_ref = 
|genus = Limonium
|species = jovibarba
|authority = (Webb ex Boiss.) Kunze
|synonyms=*Limonium jovi-barba, WebbStatice jovibarba, Webb
}}Limonium jovibarba is a species of flowering plants of the family Plumbaginaceae. The species is endemic to Cape Verde. It is listed as critically endangered by the IUCN. The species was named by Carl Ernst Otto Kunze in 1891. Its local name is carqueja, a name that may also refer to the related species Limonium brunneri and Limonium braunii.

Distribution and ecologyLimonium jovibarba occurs in humid cracks of rocky cliffs between 50 and 450 metres elevation. It is restricted to the islands of São Vicente (Monte Verde and Monte António Gomes) and São Nicolau (western part).

References

Further reading
Wolfram Lobin, Teresa Leyens, Norbert Kilian, Matthias Erben, Klaus Lewejohann, The Genus Limonium (Plumbaginaceae) on the Cape Verde Islands, W Africa'', Willdenowia, Berli), vol. 25, no. 1, 20 June 1994, p. 197-214

jovibarba
Flora of São Vicente, Cape Verde
Flora of São Nicolau, Cape Verde
Endemic flora of Cape Verde
Taxa named by Philip Barker-Webb
Taxa named by Pierre Edmond Boissier
Taxa named by Otto Kuntze